SM Kamrul Hassan is a two-star general of the Bangladesh Army. As Major General he is currently the Commandant of Bangladesh Military Academy (BMA) and previously commanded the of 66th Infantry Division and Rangpur Area, as General-Officer-Commanding (GOC). He was commissioned in the East Bengal Regiment with the 21st BMA Long Course as the top cadet in weapons training.

Education 

He is an alumnus of Mirzapur Cadet College, Bangladesh Military Academy with a Bachelors of Science and holds three master's degrees, with a Master's in Defense Studies from National University of Bangladesh, Master's in Business Administration from Royal Roads University and Master's of Scientific Management from Hyderabad University.

He is a graduate of Defense Services Command and Staff College DSCSC (Mirpur, Bangladesh), Army Command and General Staff College (Philippines), College of Defense Management (India) and National Defense College (Mirpur, Bangladesh). 

He has also attended French language courses at Alliance Françoise, Bangladesh University of Professionals and is trained in international humanitarian law. Furthermore, he has a Doctor of Philosophy (PhD) on Governement and Politics from Jahangirnagar University.

Military career 
The general has served as an instructor in training institutions of Bangladesh Armed Forces starting off as the 'youngest' Platoon Commander of Bangladesh Military Academy (BMA) to Directing Staff in Tactics Wing, School of Infantry and Tactics (SI&T), Faculty Member as both Directing Staff and later on as the 24th 'Chief Instructor' of Defense Services Command and Staff College DSCSC (Mirpur) where he trained and instructed officers from USA, France, China, Egypt, Brazil, India, Pakistan, Turkey and numerous other nations participating at DSCSC. He is appointed as the Commandant of Bangladesh Military Academy (BMA).

He has commanded two infantry battalions, the operationally active 12th East Bengal Regiment in Chittagong Hill Tracts (Bandarban) and 20th East Bengal Regiment as part of preparation of an emergency deployment to Africa responding to UN mandates, two Infantry Brigades, the 52nd Infantry Brigade and 6th Infantry Brigade,  an Infantry Division as General Officer Commanding (GOC) of the 66th Infantry Division (Defenders of the Strategic North) and Rangpur Area. As a ‘Maker of Leaders,' he has also commanded the 1st Bangladesh Battalion in Bangladesh Military Academy as 'Battalion Commander'.

He has over 10 years of "Active Operational Service" throughout his career from Lieutenant to Brigadier General with three tenures accumulating to 6 years 10 months in Chittagong Hill Tracts (Insurgency) and 4 years 6 months on expedition to Africa and Middle-East under the Blue Helmet of United Nations where, he served as Sector-Commander, in Central African Republic (MUNUSCA) leading a multinational brigade size force as Brigadier General, Contingent-Commander planning emergency deployment to Ivory Coast (UNOCI) as a Colonel,  Operations Officer in Sector Headquarters Liberia (UNMIL) as a Major and a Mechanized Platoon Commander in Iraq-Kuwait (UNIKOM) as a Captain. 

Apart from his regimental staff duties, he served twice in the Army Headquarters, Military Secretary's Branch, working on the human resource management of the officers in Bangladesh Army.

Personal life
The general is married to Rahima Akhter and the couple has one son. His father and his father's brothers were freedom fighters and their hometown residence was transformed into a mukti bahini camp during Bangladesh's Liberation War in 1971. Furthermore, his grandfather served in the British Indian Army during World War 2, operating in Burma, North Africa and Europe against Axis Forces. 

Additionally, he is a widely travelled individual and visited over 50 nations across the globe in a professional or personal capacity.

References

External links
 https://indianarmy.nic.in/Site/NewsDetail/frmNoticeDetails.aspx?ParentID=7/x1LDTCjEC27tHLLhKSLg==&MnId=7/x1LDTCjEC27tHLLhKSLg==&n=bniEtbbo9LN7kb4q3kupGg==&NewsID=Il5UrUeD4gTQtZ9DDR+hEw==

Bangladesh Army generals
Mirzapur Cadet College alumni
Royal Roads University alumni
University of Hyderabad alumni
Jahangirnagar University alumni
Living people
Year of birth missing (living people)
National Defence College (Bangladesh) alumni